Willingdon may refer to:

People 
 Freeman Freeman-Thomas, 1st Marquess of Willingdon (1866–1941), Governor General of Canada and Viceroy of India

Places 
Canada
 Burnaby-Willingdon, a former electoral district for British Columbia, Canada from 1966 to 2009
 Willingdon, Alberta, Canada
 Willingdon (electoral district), a former electoral district in Alberta, Canada from 1940 to 1959
 Willingdon Heights, a neighbourhood in Burnaby, British Columbia, Canada

England
 Willingdon, East Sussex, a village in the parish of Willingdon and Jevington, East Sussex, England
 Willingdon Down, a Site of Special Scientific Interest in Eastbourne, East Sussex, England

India
 Willingdon Airfield, former name of Safdarjung Airport in New Delhi, India
 Willingdon Island, a man-made island located in Kochi, Kerala, India
 Willingdon Hospital, later known as Ram Manohar Lohia Hospital, Delhi
 Willingdon Bridge, later known as Vivekananda Setu, Kolkata

Other uses 
 Marquess of Willingdon, a title in the Peerage of the United Kingdom
 Willingdon College, Sangli, Maharashtra, India
 Willingdon Cup, an annual amateur golf team competition among Canada's provinces
 Willingdon Sports Club, a sports club in Mumbai, India
 Willingdon Beauty, given name of the proto-revolutionary boar known as Old Major in George Orwell's Animal Farm

See also 
 Wellington (disambiguation)
 Wilmington (disambiguation)